is a comedy drama aired on Fuji TV in Japan from 11 January to 21 March 2000.

Synopsis
Setsuko Nakatani (Takako Matsu) quit her job as a stewardess in order to marry her boyfriend at the time, Hiroshi. As it didn't work out, Setsuko's parents, worried that time is passing her by, decide to introduce her to someone using Omiai, the Japanese meeting custom for marriage prospects. She meets Kōtaro Hirose (Yūsuke Santamaria), pressured by his boss to get married before being entrusted with an important job overseas. Initially, the two are not interested, but after some funny misadventures, they grow to like each other.

Cast
 Takako Matsu as Setsuko Nakatani 
 Yūsuke Santamaria as Koutaro Hirose
 Tamao Satō as Mika Kawai
 Yosuke Kubozuka as Junichi Ohata
 Ayako Kawahara as Kyoko Haneda
 Masayuki Imai as Kensuke Tanuma

Theme songs
 Opening song: First Impression by Yaen
 Ending song: Sakura no Ame, Itsuka by Takako Matsu

References

2000　Japanese television series debuts
2000　Japanese television series endings
Fuji TV dramas
Japanese comedy television series
Japanese drama television series